Lovely Abella-Manalo (born on December 11, 1986), is a Filipino dancer, host, comedian, model, entrepreneur, and an actress. She is currently under the management of Sparkle GMA Artist Center and GMA Network.

Personal life
Abella is an Ilongga, she was born and raised in Koronadal, South Cotabato, Mindanao. Her mother is from Bacolod while her father is from South Cotabato. She has a daughter named Crisha Kaye, and is married to long time relationship with Benj Manalo, son of actor-comedian Jose Manalo.

In August 2020, Abella contracted COVID-19. She was asymptomatic throughout her quarantine and eventually made a recovery.

Career 
During her teenage years, Abella said that she used to be one of the pranksters in Bitoy's Funniest Videos portraying as a massage therapist in Boracay to prank customers. According to her, this was her first-ever acting/comedy stint way back in 2004. This minor appearance opened doors for her as she was given a slot to be one of the Wowowee Dancers.

Abella was also previously known as one of the main dancers of Willie Revillame in Wil Time Bigtime when the latter moved to TV5, but was later promoted to a co-host due to her natural hosting skills and bubbly personality; giving her the opportunity to be one of the mainstays in Willie's game shows until Wowowillie. Her rising career in the network gave her many opportunities, such as guesting in various shows and even dedicating an episode for her in Star Confessions in which she shared her own life story.

Before she got her major break in GMA Network, Abella made a number of roles as an extra in various shows for both TV5 and GMA Network; most notably in Madam Chairman, Carmela, 2½ Daddies, and Buena Familia where she was left uncredited and unknown for that time being. She briefly had her comedic acting stint in A1 Ko Sa 'Yo before she got her major supporting role in Calle Siete as Bonifacia "Bonnie" Suarez.

Her biggest break in GMA Network was when she auditioned to be one of the cast members of the weekend noon-time variety show, Sunday PinaSaya where she shortly appeared as a guest before becoming a mainstay cast. Due to her potentials in comedy, she was included as a new Bubble Gang member. Even though she's been exposed to comedy shows as of now, she's still undergoing drama and acting workshops to improve her craft.

Abella was cast in the prime-time series, D' Originals, where she played her first-ever major antagonist role as Cristina "Tina" Pineda, a rival and the half-sister of Marge. She has since been frequently cast in various drama series and anthologies offered by GMA Network and GMA News TV.

Filmography

Television

Film

References

External links

Living people
Filipino female dancers
People from South Cotabato
GMA Network personalities
TV5 (Philippine TV network) personalities
1986 births